Başpınar is a Turkish place name meaning "the head (main) spring" and may refer to the following places in Turkey:

 Başpınar, Adıyaman, a village in the District of Adıyaman, Adıyaman Province
 Başpınar, Aydıntepe, a village in the District of Aydıntepe, Bayburt Province
 Başpınar, İspir
 Başpınar, Kemaliye
 Başpınar, Korkuteli, a village in the District of Korkuteli, Antalya Province
 Başpınar, Osmancık

See also
 Başpınar Nature Park